Hankiss is a surname. Notable people with the surname include:

Ágnes Hankiss (born 1950), Hungarian politician
Elemér Hankiss (1928–2015), Hungarian sociologist

See also
Hankins